The Hawks of the South was a Free Syrian Army coalition that was active during the Syrian Civil War. It was created on 27 December 2014 by Colonel Mohammed Khaled al-Duhni to strengthen the Southern Front. The coalition operated in eastern Daraa Governorate. According to the colonel, the Falcons of the South was the biggest rebel group operating in Daraa Governorate in regard to arms and fighters.

Former member groups
 18 March Division
 Yarmouk Army
 Fallujah of Horan Brigade
 Lions of Sunna Brigade

See also
List of armed groups in the Syrian Civil War

References

Anti-government factions of the Syrian civil war